All the Love in the World is a 1974 album by American singer-songwriter Mac Davis released on Columbia Records immediately following his album Stop and Smell the Roses also released in 1974. It peaked at number 21 on the Billboard 200 albums chart and reached number 6 on Billboard's Top Country Albums chart. It also charted in Canada reaching 33 on the country's RPM charts. Containing many hits including "(If You Add) All the Love in the World" and very notably "Rock 'N' Roll (I Gave You the Best Years of My Life)" written by Kevin Johnson covered later by Johnson himself, by Terry Jacks, The Cats and many others, the album was certified gold in the United States.

Track list

Credits and personnel
Mark James - electric guitar
Ken Bell - guitar
Travis Wammack - guitar
Jerry Bridges - bass
Al Lester - fiddle
James Brown - keyboards
Tim Henson - keyboards
Roger Clark - drums, percussion
Ben Cauley, Harrison Calloway, Harvey Thompson, Muscle Shoals Horns, Ronnie Eades - horn
Mac Davis - Jew's harp
Rhodes, Chalmers & Rhodes - Backing vocals

Technical
Rick Hall - Producer, Recording engineer
Gary Klein - Associate producer (tracks: 1, 5, 6)
Jack Nitzsche - Arrangement (tracks: 1, 5, 6)
Jimmie Haskell - String arrangement
Bruce Botnick - Engineer (tracks: 1, 5, 6)
Don Young - Quadraphonic Remix Engineer
Lacy O'Neal - Recording engineer
Larry Hamby - Recording engineer
Guy Webster - Photography
John Brogna - Design

References

External links
Discogs: All the Love in the World

1974 albums
Mac Davis albums